The white-breasted woodswallow (Artamus leucorynchus) is a medium sized passerine bird which breeds from the Andaman Islands east through Indonesia and northern Australia. The name "woodswallow" is a misnomer as they are not closely related to true swallows. Instead, they belong to the family Artamidae, which also includes butcherbirds, currawongs and the Australian magpie.

Taxonomy 
The species was first described by Carl Linnaeus in 1771, its specific epithet derived from the ancient Greek words leukos 'white', and rhynchos 'bill'. The species was first described by Carl Linnaeus in 1771, its specific epithet derived from the ancient Greek words leukos 'white', and rhynchos 'bill'.
Nine subspecies of Artamus leucorynchus and their habitat ranges are:
 A. l. albiventer (Lesson, 1831) - Sulawesi and Lesser Sundas
 A. l. amydrus (Oberholser, 1917) - Sumatra, Bangka, Belitung, Kangean Islands, Java and Bali
 A. l. humei (Stresemann, 1913) - Andaman and Cocos Islands
 A. l. leucopygialis (Gould, 1842) - Moluccas, Kai Island, Aru Island, New Guinea and Australia
 A. l. leucorynchus (Linnaeus, 1771) - Philippines, Palawan, Borneo and Natuna Islands
 A. l. melaleucus (Wagler, 1827) - New Caledonia, Mare and Lifou
 A. l. musschenbroeki (A. B. Meyer, 1884) - Babar Islands and Tanimbar Islands
 A. l. pelewensis (Finsch, 1876) - Palau Islands
 A. l. tenuis (Mayr, 1943) - Vanuatu and Banks Islands

Description
The White-breasted Woodswallow's plumage is dark grey on the head and neck, with white underparts, giving the species its common and scientific names, in contrast to the related great woodswallow whose upper side is a more glossy black. The stout bill of a woodswallow is bluish-grey with a black tip. White breasted woodswallows can also be identified by their short, black tail and grey feet. Their completely black tail makes them the only woodswallow lacking white on its tail. Males and females are identical in appearance. Juvenile woodswallows have a more brownish plumage around their head and mantle that is usually heavily striated. Juveniles have a buff tint on their chest and a brownish bill with a dark tip. White breasted woodswallows can grow to a maximum known size of 18 cm and weigh between 35–45 grams. All 9 subspecies of Artamus leucorynchus are differentiated by small differences in color, overall size, wing length and bill size.

Breeding and habitat 
Throughout their vast distribution across Australasia, White breasted woodswallows can be found in forests, open woodlands and semi-arid plains, with a mixture of vegetation including shrubs, mangroves, forest clearings and grasses, often near watercourses. Woodswallows are partially migratory, with southern flocks moving north during Autumn and south in the spring. The breeding season for the white-breasted woodswallow varies throughout its range. In its northern ranges breeding usually occurs between March and May and in the southern ranges occurring between August and January, pre and during the wet season. The female sexual display to invite copulation includes extending the wings over the back in a V, whilst trembling toward a male/s, then waggling the tail and quietly making an 'eep' call.
White breasted woodswallows are seen to be cooperative breeders, with birds other than parents assisting with care for offspring. Both sexes participate in building nests, incubating eggs and feeding young birds. The nest of a White breasted woodswallow are shallow, bowl-shaped nests that are built from grass, twigs and roots and lined with fine grass. Nests are situated in tree forks or hollow stumps. Woodswallows are also known to recycle abandoned magpie lark nests' to use as their own. The normal clutch size is between 2 and 5 eggs. The eggs of Artamus leucorynchus are tapered oval-shaped and cream or pinkish in color with darker brown speckles. After eggs are laid, they will be incubated for 15 days.

Behaviour and diet
Despite having a bifurcated (divided) brush-tipped tongue, which is usually associated with nectar feeders, Woodswallows are insectivores primarily feeding on insects caught on the wings in flight or from a perch, and occasionally feeding on the nectar of flowers. Although they mostly feed on insects caught in flight, Woodswallows also tend to forage on the ground or in the tree canopy. Feeding can often be communal when the catch is too large for one bird.

The white-breasted woodswallow has large, pointed wings and is very agile in powered and gliding flight. They are fast-flying and are one of few passerines that can soar. Even with their small statue, White breasted Woodswallows prove to be aggressive birds whom are quite territorial with groups mobbing larger birds as a form of defense. Out of breeding season, Woodswallows are quite nomadic, chasing flying insects and roosting in large flocks. White breasted Woodswallow are generally seen in flocks of 10-50 birds, sometimes up to 100 to a flock. Flocks tend to cluster together in the evening to roost. Woodswallows are social bird, well known for their habit of huddling up together tightly in flocks, usually along a branch or powerline. This behaviour is done as means of maintaining heat and conserving energy.

Conservation status 

With an extensive range, the species Artamus leucorynchus does not fall into vulnerable species categories. The species has a stable and large population size justifying its allocation as Least Concern. There is no evidence of the species decline and the species is recognised as common and therefore there is no alert for Artamus leucorynchus to be recognised as vulnerable throughout is localities.

References

External links

ABID images
White-breasted woodswallow videos, photos, and sounds in the Macaulay Library

white-breasted woodswallow
Birds of Malesia
Birds of New Guinea
Birds of New Caledonia
Birds of Palau
Birds of the Philippines
Birds of Vanuatu
Birds of Australia
white-breasted woodswallow
Articles containing video clips
Taxa named by Carl Linnaeus
Taxobox binomials not recognized by IUCN